HMS Kempenfelt was a  of the British Royal Navy. She was built by the Cammell Laird at their Birkenhead shipyard, with construction starting in 1914 and completed in August 1915. She served through the remainder of the First World War. She was sold  for scrap in 1921.

Construction and design
Flotilla Leaders were large destroyer-type vessels intended to lead flotillas of smaller destroyers in action.

The design displacement was  normal and  full load, with a displacement of  stated for Nimrod in 1919. Cruising turbines were fitted to the outer shafts. Four funnels were fitted.

The ship's main gun armament consisted of four QF  Mk IV guns mounted on the ships centreline, with two of the guns positioned between the ship's funnels. An anti-aircraft armament of two 1-pounder (37 mm) "pom-pom" autocannons was planned, but during construction the 1-pounder pom-poms were diverted to the British Expeditionary Force when it deployed to France at the start of the First World War, and the ship completed with two 2-pounder (40-mm) "pom-pom"s instead. Torpedo armament consisted of two twin 21-inch (533 mm) torpedo tubes.  In August 1915 Kempenfelt was selected for conversion to a fast minelayer, but owing to problems during sea trials, sister ship  was selected instead. In 1916, Kempenfelt was fitted with an explosive anti-submarine sweep, but this was removed in July that year. The ship's crew was 104 officers and men.

Kempenfelt was laid down at Cammell Laird's Birkenhead shipyard on 2 October 1914 and was launched on 1 May 1915. The ship was completed on 20 August 1915.

Service
On 14 August 1915, while undergoing sea trials in Liverpool Bay, Kempenfelt reported sighted the periscope of an unknown submarine, possibly . On 21 August 1915, following commissioning Kempenfelt joined the newly established 11th Destroyer Flotilla at Scapa Flow, part of the Grand Fleet, as leader. On 6 January 1916, the pre-dreadnought battleship , which was travelling alone because the severe weather prevented destroyers from keeping pace, struck a mine near Cape Wrath. When reports of the mining reached Scapa Flow, Kempenfelt and 12 destroyers were despatched to assist and to protect the stricken battleship from enemy submarines. (It was thought at first that King Edward VII had been torpedoed).

Kempenfelt sailed as part of the 11th Destroyer Flotilla at the Battle of Jutland on 31 May–1 June 1916. Kempenfelt survived the battle without damage.

Kempenfelt remained part of the 11th Flotilla until September 1917, joining the 6th Destroyer Flotilla as part of the Dover Patrol on 15 September, where she served until 2 April 1918, then rejoining the 11th Flotilla. Kempenfelt was still a member of the 11th Flotilla at the end of the war. By March 1919, Kempenfelt was in reserve at Portsmouth. She was sold for scrap to T W Ward on 9 May 1921 for £2778 and was broken up at Ward's Morecambe yard from August 1921.

Pennant numbers

Notes

Citations

Bibliography

External links 

 Battle of Jutland Crew Lists Project - HMS Kempenfelt Crew List

Marksman-class flotilla leaders
World War I destroyers of the United Kingdom
1915 ships
Ships built on the River Mersey